The 1937–38 Scottish Division One season was won by Celtic by three points over nearest rival Heart of Midlothian. Dundee and Morton finished 19th and 20th respectively and were relegated to the 1938–39 Scottish Division Two.

League table

Results

References 

 Statto.com

1937–38 Scottish Football League
Scottish Division One seasons
Scot